Events in the year 1980 in Portugal.

Incumbents
President: António Ramalho Eanes
Prime Minister: Francisco de Sá Carneiro

Events
1 January – 1980 Azores Islands earthquake
5 October – Portuguese legislative election, 1980
4 December – Prime minister Francisco de Sá Carneiro dies.
7 December – Portuguese presidential election, 1980

Arts and entertainment

Sports

Births

25 February – Marisa Barros, runner.

Deaths
4 December – Francisco de Sá Carneiro, politician (born 1934)

References

 
Years of the 20th century in Portugal